Valprionde (Languedocien: Valpronda) is a former commune in the Lot department in south-western France. On 1 January 2016, it was merged into the new commune of Montcuq-en-Quercy-Blanc. Its population was 126 in 2018.

Geography
The Séoune flows southwestward through the middle of the commune.

See also
Communes of the Lot department

References

Former communes of Lot (department)